The Worldwide Ultralite Spitfire is an American ultralight aircraft that was designed by Fred Bell and manufactured by Worldwide Ultralite Industries and later by Don Ecker and Air Magic Ultralights of Houston, Texas. The aircraft was supplied as a kit for amateur construction.

Design and development
The Spitfire is a derivative of the Phantom X1 that was created by former Phantom Aeronautics employee Fred Bell, who also designed the Bell Sidewinder. It features a strut-braced high-wing, a single-seat, open cockpit, tricycle landing gear and a single engine in tractor configuration.

The aircraft is made from bolted-together aluminum tubing, with the flying surfaces covered in Dacron sailcloth. The Spitfire differs from the X1 in having flaps, struts in place of cable-bracing, a centre stick and a cog-belt reduction drive. Its  span wing is supported by "V" struts and jury struts. The pilot is accommodated on an open seat, partially enclosed by a fibreglass fairing with a windshield.

The design pushes the empty weight limits set by FAR 103 and thus has to be built carefully and cannot be fitted with options if it is to be legally flown in this category.

A two-seat version in side-by-side configuration was also produced by Air Magic Ultralights.

Variants
Spitfire
Single seat version powered by a  Rotax 447 engine. It was offered in Ultralight and Super Sport configurations, with the latter having a larger engine, more instruments, sprung steel landing gear, an auxiliary fuel tank and wheel pants.
Spitfire II
Two seats in side-by-side configuration version powered by a  Rotax 503 engine. It was offered in an Elite configuration that included bucket seats, a larger engine and a  fuel tank.

Specifications (Spitfire)

See also

References

External links
Photo of Spitfire in flight

1980s United States ultralight aircraft
Homebuilt aircraft
Single-engined tractor aircraft
Worldwide Ultralite aircraft